The Kimera Evo 37 is a sports car produced by Kimera Automobili as a reminiscence of the Lancia Rally 037.

Overview
The Rally 037 is a vehicle designed by the Italian car manufacturer Lancia for rallying. Due to the homologation, there was also a street legal variant. A total of 257 Rally 037s were built in the 1980s.

In May 2021, the Italian rally driver Luca Betti presented a new edition, which, like the Rally 037, is based on a Lancia Beta Montecarlo. However, only the passenger cell with the chassis number came from the Montecarlo. The remaining components were newly developed. The new edition, limited to 37 copies, had its public premiere at the Goodwood Festival of Speed in July 2021. Production takes place in Cuneo, Italy at Kimera Automobili. The company name comes from the Italian language and stands for the chimera, a hybrid creature from Greek mythology. It can also be seen on the manufacturer's emblem. The base price of the sports car before taxes is 540,000 euros.

With the New Stratos, Manifattura Automobili Torino has been building a vehicle since 2018 that is also intended to be reminiscent of an older Lancia model (Lancia Stratos). In the same year, Automobili Amos announced the Delta Futurista as a throwback to the Lancia Delta HF Integrale 16V. In 2022, a restomod based on the Lancia Delta HF Integrale from Maturo Competition Cars made its debut.

Specifications
Parts of the body of the Evo 37 are made of carbon fiber reinforced plastic. The chassis with two double wishbones at the front and rear was developed by Öhlins. The carbon-ceramic brake system comes from Brembo. Compared to the Rally 037, the Kimera has been modernized and better equipped. For example, it has LED lights, an anti-lock braking system , air conditioning and a camera-based interior mirror. In contrast to the Rally 037, the engine of the new edition not only has a supercharger , but also a turbocharger for the high power ranges. The 6-speed sequential gearbox is by Dana Graziano, it is also used in the Audi R8 42 and the Lamborghini Gallardo.

References

Cars introduced in 2021
Cars of Italy
Rear mid-engine, rear-wheel-drive vehicles